The Training and Administration Department of the Central Military Commission  is the chief organ under the Central Military Commission of the People's Republic of China. It was founded on January 11, 2016, under Xi Jinping's military reforms. Its first and current director is Major General  Li Huohui

References

See also 

 Central Military Commission (China)

Central Military Commission (China)
Defence agencies of China
2016 establishments in China
Government agencies established in 2016